Likely Herman "Like" McBrien OBE (7 December 1892 – 22 December 1956) was a leading Australian rules football administrator in the Victorian Football League (VFL) and a Victorian politician.

Likely McBrien was born on 7 December 1892 in South Melbourne and educated at Middle Park Central School.  In 1906 he commenced work as a messenger for The Age newspaper.  He served in World War I in a clerical capacity and was based in London. Following his discharge from the services in 1917 he resumed work at The Age, becoming assistant circulation manager and advertising manager.  In 1922–29 he was secretary of the Authorised News Agents' Association of Victoria.

On 16 July 1919 he married Madge Margaret Summers at St Luke's Anglican Church, South Melbourne.

McBrien was an avid sportsman with a variety of interests.  He played cricket and tennis, and later golf and bowls, and was a prominent rower. Australian rules football was the passion of his life. From 1909 to 1911 he was a player and treasurer of the Leopold Football Club (later the South Melbourne Football Club's second XVIII).  He went on to a long career in football administration.

He was a qualified accountant, and a fellow of the International Institute of Accountants and of the Institute of Commerce, England. In addition, he was a director of Disher & McBrien Pty Ltd.

Likely McBrien died of cerebral thrombosis on 22 December 1956 and was survived by his wife, daughter and son.

Public life 
McBrien held many public posts: chairman of the Edith Cavell Fund Trust, the Homes for Aged and Infirm Society, and the Yarra Bend National Park Trust; honorary treasurer of the Travellers' Aid Society and of the Victorian Anti-Sweating and Industrial Improvement League; executive-member of the Playgrounds and Recreation Association of Victoria; and trustee of the Heidelberg branch of the Returned Sailors', Soldiers' and Airmen's Imperial League of Australia.

Political career 
McBrien was elected to the Victorian Legislative Council in 1943 as an Independent member for the province of Melbourne North.  He served as commissioner of public works and vice-president of the Board of Land and Works in Ian MacFarlan's short-lived ministry in 1945. One of his chief commitments was to campaign for the rehabilitation of returned servicemen. In 1949 he was defeated in the elections for the Legislative Council.

Football administration 
He was a committee-member of South Melbourne Football Club from 1912 and Secretary from 1922 to 1928.

He was VFL Secretary from 1929 to 1956.  He was instrumental in the VFL buying its first head office, Harrison House, in Spring Street, Melbourne, in 1929. He played a leading role in negotiations with the Melbourne Cricket Ground (MCG) Trustees, which led to the finals being played at the MCG.  He also campaigned strongly (but unsuccessfully) for the amalgamation of the VFL and the Victorian Football Association.

McBrien recruited other key administrators of the VFL, Eric McCutchan and Jack Hamilton.

Honours 
McBrien was appointed OBE in 1950. He was inducted to the Australian Football Hall of Fame in 1996.

References 

 Australian Dictionary of Biography, Online Edition
 Australian Football Hall of Fame

Australian Football Hall of Fame inductees
Victoria (Australia) state politicians
VFL/AFL administrators
Leopold Football Club (MJFA) players
Sydney Swans administrators
1892 births
1956 deaths
Deaths from cerebral thrombosis
20th-century Australian politicians
People from South Melbourne
Politicians from Melbourne
Australian accountants
Australian Officers of the Order of the British Empire